The 2022 American Athletic Conference baseball tournament will be held at BayCare Ballpark in Clearwater, Florida, from May 24 through 29. The event, held at the end of the conference regular season, determines the champion of the American Athletic Conference for the 2022 season.  The winner of the double-elimination tournament will receive the conference's automatic bid to the 2022 NCAA Division I baseball tournament.

The Tournament has been held since 2014, the first year of the rebranding as the American Athletic Conference.  Since then, Houston and East Carolina have each won the event twice, while among current members Cincinnati and South Florida have each won once.

Format and seeding
The top eight baseball teams in The American will be seeded based on their records in conference play.  The tournament will use a two bracket double-elimination format, leading to a single championship game between the winners of each bracket.

Bracket

Schedule

References

Tournament
American Athletic Conference Baseball Tournament
Baseball competitions in Clearwater, Florida
American Athletic Conference baseball tournament
American Athletic Conference baseball tournament
College baseball tournaments in Florida